John Campbell (1789 – August 9, 1834) was a Scottish-born farmer and political figure in Upper Canada. He represented Frontenac in the Legislative Assembly of Upper Canada from 1830 to 1834 as a Reformer.

He received a land grant in Upper Canada and lived in Kingston. Campbell served in the Royal Navy on Lake Erie during the War of 1812. He was commander of HMS Chippawa, was wounded and taken prisoner. Campbell served as justice of the peace for the Midland District. He died in Kingston.

References

External links
 

1789 births
1834 deaths
Members of the Legislative Assembly of Upper Canada
Canadian justices of the peace